Antonio L’Horfelin (1587–1660) was a Spanish painter.
He was born at Zaragoza. He was the son of an obscure artist, named Pedro L'Horfelin, who sent him to Rome for improvement when he was very young. He painted a  St. Joseph  with two laterals, in the church of the Barefoot Augustines at Zaragoza.

References
Antonio Palomino, An account of the lives and works of the most eminent Spanish painters, sculptors and architects, 1724, first English translation, 1739, p. 46

17th-century Spanish painters
Spanish male painters
Spanish Baroque painters
1587 births
1660 deaths